The Bridge In Blue is the fourth and last album from The Brooklyn Bridge, renamed The Bridge, released by Buddah Records.

Track listing
"Bruno's Place"
"I Feel Free"
"School Days"
"Baby What You Want Me to Do"
"Glad to See You Got Religion"
"Uptown"
"Hospital Lady"
"Man in a Band"

References

Johnny Maestro & the Brooklyn Bridge albums
Buddah Records albums
1972 albums